Janice Petersen is an Australian television presenter. She is currently the presenter of SBS World News on Special Broadcasting Service (SBS).

Early life
Petersen was born in 1977 to parents of South African lineage in Sydney. She was raised in Woy Woy on the Central Coast of New South Wales. Also grew up with her brother Dale Petersen. Janice lives in Sydney with her partner Julian Hamilton of electronic band The Presets. The couple have two daughters, born in 2010 and 2013.

She is a graduate from the University of Newcastle after qualifying for the Bachelor of Communication degree.

Career
Petersen went to work at SBS in 2000 as a freelance staff person and soon was operating the autocue and writing obscure freelance stories, then moved over to ABC in Adelaide, South Australia as a newsreader after landing a bi-media cadetship. Petersen returned to SBS in 2006 as a sports presenter.

Personal life
A sports enthusiast, she participated in the high jump, 100 metre and 200 metre sprints, and netball. She is a photographer and has had her photographs published for the 2000 Summer Olympics and street life around Sydney.

A portrait painting of Janice by Swiss-born Victorian artist Marc de Jong was named among the finalists in the 2010 Archibald Prize.

References

Living people
1977 births
Australian television presenters
Australian women television presenters
Australian people of South African descent
People from Sydney